Petal Search (also known simply as Petal) is a search engine owned and operated by Huawei.

History 
In 2019, multinational technology company Huawei was affected by the sanctions enforced during an ongoing international trade ban. Huawei’s new and upcoming Android smartphones were denied access to Google Mobile Services. Due to these restrictions, Huawei decided to expand the scope of the Petal Search service to create an independent search engine.

In 2022, Petal Search has been announced as the winner of iF DESIGN AWARD 2022.

Functionality

Third-party App Stores 
Petal Search is a mobile search engine and also provides users who are searching for mobile phone applications with results from the  AppGallery (Huawei's official app store) and other third-party stores. When a user searches for an app, Petal Search includes results from "trusted" app stores. This feature is integrated with the AppGallery.

Search Channels

Visual Search 
Petal Search supports searching for photos, reverse image search, and the standard text-based search. Visual search functions rely on Huawei’s visual search technology, HiTouch. It can search for and detect multiple objects in an image at the same time. For example, when a user takes a photo of a sofa with a blanket and a cushion on it, Petal Search can identify all three items, and then deliver search results based on that.

Voice Search 
Petal Search supports voice search for English, Spanish, French, Arabic, Turkish and other languages.

News Search 
Petal Search crawls and lists results from news outlets.

Video Search 
Petal Search provides users specifically with video URLs if chosen by the user. If a general query returns video results it will also be included in the results page.

App Search 
Petal Search offers a mobile application search functionality which allows users to search the AppGallery and other third-party sources.

Shopping Search 
Users can search for consumer products on Petal Search and then follow a link to the online store make a purchase.

Travel Search 
A flight reservation function is available on Petal Search. Users can also book hotels or search for information on flights such as the arrival time. Nearby restaurants, local tourist spots and attractions and local events can also be searched for.

Local Search 
The Near Me function facilitate finding local businesses, nearby products and services and consumer reviews. Data providers: Uberall, Tripadvisor, Yell, Foursquare and more.

Design 
Petal Search’s logo design is based on the shape of a magnifying glass. The main focus is currently to develop the service for mobile devices, therefore its design is rooted in a “mobile-first” approach. It also offers a “dark mode” option.

Availability 
Petal Search is active in different markets around the world, currently focusing its operations in European countries. Mainly in Spain and Turkey. As of November 2021, Petal Search supports 55 languages and is available in 170 countries and regions around the world. Currently, Petal Search application is available to download in Huawei AppGallery and Apple App Store.

See also 
 Huawei Mobile Services
 Petal Maps

References 

Internet search engines
Huawei products

External links 
Official website